Kalbach-Riedberg is a borough (Ortsbezirk) of Frankfurt am Main, Germany. It is subdivided into the Stadtbezirke Kalbach and Riedberg. Kalbach has a long history and has been mentioned in documented sources as early as year 772. 1200 years later, in 1972, Kalbach was incorporated into Frankfurt am Main. The Riedberg area of Kalbach-Riedberg has a more recent history. As a way to combat housing shortage in Frankfurt am Main, a project to create housing space for about 20,000 was initiated here in 2001. As of 2020, Kalbach-Riedberg has a population of 22,170.

References

Districts of Frankfurt